Cora dewisanti is a species of basidiolichen in the family Hygrophoraceae. It was formally described as a new species in 2016 by Bibiana Moncada, Alejandra Suárez-Corredor, and Robert Lücking. The specific epithet dewisanti refers to the Welsh version of the name David (Dewi Sant), and honours mycologist David Leslie Hawksworth. The lichen occurs at elevations above  in the northern Andes from Venezuela to Ecuador, where it grows on the ground between bryophytes and other lichens.

References

dewisanti
Lichen species
Lichens described in 2016
Lichens of South America
Taxa named by Robert Lücking
Basidiolichens